Rūsiņš of Satekle was a Latgalian duke during early 13th century who is several times mentioned in ancient sources due to his activities in Livonian Crusade.

Rūsiņš date of birth is unknown and it's presumed that his residence was Satekle castle (most likely Tanīsa hillfort in modern Rauna village) which was important centre in Latgalian county of Tālava. According to Chronicle of the Henry of Livonia Rūsiņš had permanent group of warriors with him (Latin: amici Russini) most likely similar to Druzhina.

Rūsiņš is first time mentioned by name in 1208 when he together with dukes Varidots of Autīne and Tālivaldis of Beverīna signed military alliance with the Livonian Brothers of the Sword. In the next few years Rūsiņš was often involved in the military campaigns against estonian tribes.

In the autumn of 1208 Rūsiņš together with Varidots raided into estonian land of Saccalia and heavily devastated it. In the winter of 1209 latgalians signed a one-year peace treaty with estonians. Soon as the treaty expired Rūsiņš joined the knight Berthold of Wenden in his campaign against Ugandians. After this campaign livonians and part of the latgalians signed a new peace treaty with estonians but Rūsiņš was among those latgalians who together with Swordbrothers continued warfare. It is known that Rūsiņš participated in military campaign against estonians in early 1211 also in a raid to estonian land of Soontagana together with crusaders, Russians from Pskov and livonian dukes Dabrels, Ninns and Caupo of Turaida. Most likely he also took part in joint livonian, latgalian and crusader campaign into Saccala and subsequent siege of Viljandi castle.
In 1211 ugandians raided into latgalian lands and killed several of Rūsiņš relatives.

In summer of 1212 latgalians from Autīne land came into conflict with German crusaders. This conflict soon turned into armed uprising against German knights so called Autīne revolt. Rūsiņš joined the uprising and came to livonian Satesele castle (modern Satezele hillfort in Sigulda) which was main centre of uprising. Crusaders soon besieged the castle. According to the Chronicle of the Henry of Livonia Rūsiņš was on the castle wall when he saw his friend and former ally knight Berthold among crusaders, he took off his helmet to greet him and almost immediately  was killed by crossbow arrow.

It is still not known why Rūsiņš who was loyal ally of crusaders quite suddenly joined the anti German uprising. Maybe he felt that German crusaders are threat to his authority and estates or maybe that crusaders are exploiting him and other latgalians to consolidate their rule in Livonia. Due to Rūsiņš activity in battles author of the Chronicle of the Henry of Livonia calls him bravest of all latgalians (Latin:Letthorum fortissimus)

References 

1212 deaths
Medieval Latgalian people
People of the Livonian Crusade
Military personnel killed in action